The Asia Literary Review was a quarterly literary journal published in English and distributed internationally. It included articles of fiction, non-fiction, poetry, and the photography genre. The journal first published in Hong Kong in 2000 as a small local literary journal called Dim Sum, founded by Nuri Vittachi. Later, Nuri became involved with British businessman and philanthropist Ilyas Khan, who provided encouragement and financial support for the first decade. Khan was a Hong Kong supporter of arts and together they created an international showcase for writers from the Asian region.

The journal advocated Asian writers by providing a platform for their work to be read in English by international readers. The journal ceased publication suddenly and without any explanation in 2019 during the Hong Kong protests. After a year-long hiatus on its Twitter account, the Asia Literary Review posted an uncaptioned photo of the goddess of democracy on June 4, 2020, the 31st anniversary of its destruction in Tiananmen Square.

Contributors/Interview subjects 
The magazine published interviews with figures such as Aung San Suu Kyi, David Mitchell, Salman Rushdie and Kyung-sook Shin (2011 winner of the Man Asian Literary Prize). Other contributors includes Margaret Atwood, Justin Hill,  Liu Xiaobo, Su Tong, Arvind Krishna Mehrotra, Laurie Thompson, Seamus Heaney, Kim Young-ha, Ko Un, Zheng Danyi, Bei Dao, Shehan Karunatilaka and Xu Xi.

Poetry Parnassus 
At Poetry Parnassus, part of the London 2012 Cultural Olympiad, an Asia Literary Review Celebration Reading was held at the Southbank Centre. Participants included Marjorie Evasco, Jang Jin-sung, Kim Hyesoon, Alvin Pang, Laksmi Pamuntjak and Jennifer Wong.

The event was covered by the Philippine Star and other media including CBN News.

Staff 
Managing Editor:  Phillip Kim (Listed on website as business and finance director)

Editor in Chief:  Martin Alexander  2010-Present   (Poetry editor 2000 - 2015)

Consulting Editors: Peter Koenig, Robert Hemley, Anurima Roy

Senior Editors: Justin Hill,  Kavita Jindal, Miichael Vatikiotis, Zheng Danyi

Former staff 
Editor:  Chris Wood (2008? -?)

Literary Editor:  Kelly Falconer (Nov 2011 - Dec 2012)

Managing Editor and co-founder: Duncan Jepson (2004 - 2011)

contributors includes Margaret Atwood, Justin Hill,  Liu Xiaobo, Su Tong, Arvind Krishna Mehrotra, Laurie Thompson, Seamus Heaney, Kim Young-ha, Ko Un, Zheng Danyi, Bei Dao, Shehan Karunatilaka and Xu Xi.

Poetry Parnassus
At Poetry Parnassus, part of the London 2012 Cultural Olympiad, an Asia Literary Review Celebration Reading was held at the Southbank Centre. Participants included Marjorie Evasco, Jang Jin-sung, Kim Hyesoon, Alvin Pang, Laksmi Pamuntjak and Jennifer Wong.

The event was covered by the Philippine Star and other media including CBN News.

Staff 
Managing Editor:  Phillip Kim (Listed on website as business and finance director)

Editor in Chief:  Martin Alexander  2010-   (Poetry editor 2000 - 2015)

Consulting Editors: Peter Koenig, Robert Hemley, Anurima Roy

Senior Editors: Justin Hill,  Kavita Jindal, Miichael Vatikiotis, Zheng Danyi

Former staff

Editor:  Chris Wood (2008? -?)

Literary Editor:  Kelly Falconer (Nov 2011 - Dec 2012)

Managing Editor and co-founder: Duncan Jepson (2004 - 2011)

References

External links
 Official website

Art magazines published in China
Literary magazines published in China
Magazines published in Hong Kong
Magazines established in 2000
Quarterly magazines published in Hong Kong
English-language magazines